Nelson is a city located in the Selkirk Mountains on the West Arm of Kootenay Lake in the Southern Interior of British Columbia, Canada. Known as "The Queen City", and acknowledged for its impressive collection of restored heritage buildings from its glory days in a regional silver rush, Nelson is one of the three cities forming the commercial and population core of the West Kootenay region, the others being Castlegar and Trail. The city is the seat of the Regional District of Central Kootenay. It is represented in the provincial legislature by the riding of Nelson-Creston, and in the Parliament of Canada by the riding of Kootenay—Columbia.

History

Founding
The western Kootenay region of British Columbia, where the city of Nelson is situated, is part of the traditional territories of the Sinixt (or Lakes) and Ktunaxa (Kutenai) peoples.

Gold and silver were found in the area in 1867. Following the discovery of silver at nearby Toad Mountain in 1886, the town boomed quickly, leading to incorporation in 1897. Two railways were built to pass through Nelson. Due to its location near transportation corridors, Nelson grew to supply the local mining activity and soon became a transportation and distribution centre for the region.

Nelson was named in 1888 after Hugh Nelson, then Lieutenant-Governor of British Columbia.

Early 20th century

Francis Rattenbury, an architect most noted in British Columbia for the Parliament Buildings in Victoria, the Vancouver Provincial Courthouse, and the second Hotel Vancouver, designed chateau-style civic buildings made of granite, which stand today. By the 1900s, Nelson boasted several fine hotels, a Hudson's Bay Company store and an electric streetcar system. The local forestry and mining industries were well established.

The town built its own hydroelectric generating system. English immigrants planted lakeside orchards, and Doukhobors from Russia, sponsored by Tolstoy and the Quakers, tilled the valley benchlands. The Doukhobor museum is located nearby, close to the neighbouring town of Castlegar.

Nelson 1917-1920 used Single transferable vote (STV), a form of proportional representation, to elect its councillors. Councillors were elected in one at-large district. Each voter cast just a single vote, using a ranked transferable ballot.

During the Vietnam War, many American draft evaders settled in Nelson and the surrounding area. This influx of liberal, mostly educated young people had a significant impact on the area's cultural and political demographics.

Nelson's mountainous geography kept growth confined to the narrow valley bottom, except for certain hillside structures such as the local High School and the former Notre Dame University College (NDU) campus. Throughout the '60s and '70s, when more prosperous cities were tearing down and rebuilding their downtowns to the design of the time, Nelson merchants 'modernized' their buildings with covers of aluminum siding.

Baker Street
In the early 1980s, Nelson suffered a devastating economic downturn when the local Kootenay Forest Products sawmill was closed. Downtown merchants were already suffering from the opening of a large, regional shopping centre on Nelson's central waterfront, the Chahko Mika Mall. At the time, Victoria and Vancouver were experimenting with historical restorations of their oldest areas, with some success. To save downtown and Baker Street from blight, Nelson quickly followed suit, stripping aluminum facades and restoring the buildings to their original brilliance. Local designer Bob Inwood, one of Nelson's many American immigrants, played a major role as a consultant. By 1985, Baker Street was completely transformed. Affirmation of the street's success came in 1986 when Steve Martin chose to produce his feature film Roxanne largely in Nelson, using the local fire hall as a primary set and many historic locations for others. More broadly, the transformation marked the beginning of Nelson's ongoing transition from a resource-based town to an arts and tourism town. A walk down Baker Street through the Historic District is now one of Nelson's promoted visitor activities.

Geography

Climate
Nelson has a humid continental climate (Köppen Dfb) with four distinct seasons. Winters are cold and snowy while summers are warm and drier with cool temperatures during the night.

Demographics

Nelson's poverty rate to over twice the provincial and national averages.

Ethnicity

Religion 
According to the 2021 census, religious groups in Nelson included:
Irreligion (7,415 persons or 69.1%)
Christianity (2,675 persons or 24.9%)
Buddhism (150 persons or 1.4%)
Judaism (115 persons or 1.1%)
Sikhism (70 persons or 0.7%)
Hinduism (65 persons or 0.6%)
Islam (20 persons or 0.2%)
Indigenous Spirituality (10 persons or 0.1%)

Economy
Historically Nelson had been noted for its illegal marijuana production, with The Guardian reporting in 2010 that:

Nelson has several retail outlets for natural foods, including a year-round market specializing in these products. A local news source claimed the Kootenay Country Co-op is "the largest independent member-owned natural food store in Canada and a respected player nationally in organic retail circles." The Save-On-Foods in Nelson is that company's leading store for organic and natural foods.

The Nelson Brewing Company is a microbrewery in Nelson.

Arts and culture
Nelson is noted as a cultural centre.

Attractions
In 1998, Nelson was highlighted as the "Number One Small Town Arts Community in Canada" by the publisher of The 100 Best Small Arts Towns in America, and is home to a large and diverse artisan community.

The annual Artwalk, a display of artwork at various venues around town, features local talent where trippers and artwalkers (as the locals call them) can get an up close and personal look at the studios and creative processes of local artisans.  July, August and September mark three months of exhibitions throughout the downtown core in variety of galleries and local businesses. Each month has a separate grand opening, (usually the first Friday evening of the month), which includes refreshments, musicians, pan-handlers and artwork for locals and visitors to enjoy as they stroll through downtown Nelson. 

The Cottonwood Community Market, located at Cottonwood Falls Park, takes place every Saturday from May through October. The Downtown Local Market happens on Baker Street every Wednesday from June through September. Marketfest, a lively nighttime street market in the heart of Nelson's downtown, happens on the last Friday of the month in June, July, and August. The markets all offer regional farm produce, delicious foods, and a variety of locally hand-crafted products.

Two local hiking trails are popular. The Pulpit Rock Trail offers a short but somewhat challenging hike that ends with a view of the city. After Pulpit Rock the trail continues up the spine of Elephant Mountain (as the locals call it) to more postcard views, and eventually to the radio towers which are visible from everywhere in the city. Hikers venturing beyond Pulpit Rock should have basic wilderness gear and exercise common sense. Public access to the Pulpit Rock trail has been restored with the opening, in the spring of 2009, of a new access point several hundred metres west of the old trail head, which was on private land.

In the winter, skiing and snowboarding are Nelson's primary outdoor activities. The resort also provides access to hundreds of kilometres of off-piste skiing and back country touring. In 2012 Nelson and Rossland, a small city southwest of Nelson, were jointly voted the best ski locales in North America by the readers of California-based Powder magazine.

Mountain biking is part of the local culture, and Nelson offers a wide variety of MTB-oriented trails for all experience levels.

Rock climbing is also a popular summer activity. Kootenay Crag, Hall Siding, Grohman Narrows and CIC Bluffs are popular city crags. Slocan Bluffs and Kinnaird are in nearby Slocan City and Castlegar. 2003 saw bouldering take off in Nelson, with extensive new development of bouldering areas in Grohman Narrows and nearby Robson.

Nelson is also located close to Kokanee Glacier Provincial Park.

On January 13, 2007, Nelson was the broadcast location for the annual Hockey Day in Canada special.

Sports

Infrastructure

Transportation

Trail Airport is another airport which is also nearby, while Nelson Airport is several blocks away from downtown Nelson. Public transit in Nelson is provided by the West Kootenay Transit System, which runs several routes within the city and to neighbouring communities.

Both Level 2 and Level 3 (DC fast-charging) electric vehicle charging stations have been installed in the city. A carsharing service is available in the city through the Kootenay Carshare Co-operative

Nelson is served by the freight-only Kootenay Valley Railway, an internal business unit of the Canadian Pacific Railway.  Nelson is the historic headquarters of the CPR Kootenay Division, serving as the meeting point of the CPR Boundary subdivision running towards Castlegar, BC, and the CPR Nelson subdivision running towards Cranbrook.

Education
School District 8 Kootenay Lake operates public schools in Nelson and surrounding communities.

Nelson Christian Community School. NCCS. K-Gr.8

Saint Joseph's Catholic School

The Conseil scolaire francophone de la Colombie-Britannique operates one French-language school: école des Sentiers-alpins.

Nelson is home to the Tenth Street, and Silver King campuses of Selkirk College, as well as Kootenay School of the Arts.

Kootenay Columbia College of Integrative Health Sciences has three campus locations on Baker Street in Nelson.

Media

Radio
 CJLY-FM 93.5 (Kootenay Co-op Radio)
 CBYN-FM 98.7 (CBC Radio One; repeats CBTK-FM Kelowna)
 CHNV-FM 103.5 ("The Bridge")
 CKKC-FM 106.9 ("EZ Rock")

Print
The Nelson Daily News was a local newspaper which began publishing in 1902. In 2010, it was announced the paper would shut down following a final edition to be published July 16, 2010. The closure occurred shortly after the Nelson Daily News''' acquisition by Black Press, which purchased the paper from Glacier Media Inc.

Black Press owns the Nelson Star'', now published weekly.

Notable people

Greg Adams — former professional hockey player
Sarah Allen — actress
Edward Applewhaite — politician
Nancy Argenta — soprano singer
Selwyn G. Blaylock — mining official
Robbie Bourdon — freeride mountain biker
Margaret Catley-Carlson — civil servant
Anne DeGrace — writer and illustrator
Alana DeLong — politician
Benno Friesen — politician, professor
Danny Gare — former professional hockey player and coach
James E. Gill — geologist, engineer
Ona Grauer — actress
Robert Hampton Gray — naval officer and pilot
John Greyson — director and writer
Ted Hargreaves — professional hockey player and coach
Lillian Hickey — All-American Girls Professional Baseball League player
John Houston — newspaper editor and politician
Levi William Humphrey — politician
Tim Hus — country and folk singer
Martin Michael Johnson — bishop
Lionel Kearns — poet and teacher
Geoff Kinrade — professional hockey player
Laurelee Kopeck — field hockey player
Patrick Lane — poet
Mike Laughton — professional hockey player
Edna Malone — dancer
Thomas Middleditch — actor, writer
Kliph Nesteroff - writer
John Newlove — poet
Frederick Niven - writer
Bri Price — musician
Pat Price — professional hockey player
Sandy Santori — politician
Adham Shaikh — composer, sound designer
Kurt Sorge — freeride mountain biker
Norman Symonds — musician
Daniel C. Van Norman — educator, clergyman, school founder
Tom Velisek — snowboarder
Padma Viswanathan — playwright
Jack Wright — tennis player

See also
Nelson Daily News

Notes

References

External links 

 
Cities in British Columbia
Mining communities in British Columbia